Edwin Rosario Díaz (born January 15, 1975 in Bayamon, Puerto Rico) is a Puerto Rican former professional baseball second baseman. He started as the second baseman for the Arizona Diamondbacks Major League Baseball (MLB) in their inaugural regular season game. He finished his career with 2 hits in 7 games.

See also
 List of Major League Baseball players from Puerto Rico

External links

Edwin Diaz

1975 births
Living people
Arizona Diamondbacks players
Cangrejeros de Santurce (baseball) players
Charleston RiverDogs players
Charlotte Rangers players
Edmonton Trappers players
Gulf Coast Rangers players
Liga de Béisbol Profesional Roberto Clemente infielders
Long Island Ducks players
Major League Baseball players from Puerto Rico
Major League Baseball second basemen
Mexican League baseball second basemen
Mexican League baseball shortstops
Mexican League baseball third basemen
Oklahoma City 89ers players
Oklahoma RedHawks players
Olmecas de Tabasco players
Sportspeople from Bayamón, Puerto Rico
Pericos de Puebla players
Puerto Rican expatriate baseball players in Canada
Puerto Rican expatriate baseball players in Mexico
Rojos del Águila de Veracruz players
Tucson Sidewinders players
Tulsa Drillers players